Titan Publishing Group is the publishing division of Titan Entertainment Group, which was established in 1981. The books division has two main areas of publishing: film and television tie-ins and cinema reference books; and graphic novels and comics references and art titles. Its imprints are Titan Books, Titan Comics and Titan Magazines.

As of 2016, Titan Books' editorial director is Laura Price.

Titan Books
Titan Books is a publisher of film, video game and TV tie-in books. As of 2011, the company publishes on average 30 to 40 such titles per year, across a range of formats from "making of" books to screenplays to TV companions and novels, and has a backlist reprint program.

Titan Books' first title was a trade paperback collection of Brian Bolland's Judge Dredd stories from 2000 AD. Titan Books followed the first title with numerous other 2000 AD reprints.  Subsequently, the publishing company expanded operations, putting out its first original title in 1987 (Pat Mills and Hunt Emerson's You Are Maggie Thatcher.) Around this time, Titan also began publishing Escape magazine (although the title was canceled in 1989). Titan Books continues to publish both new and licensed graphic novels, as well as film and television tie-ins.

Titan Books’ range of fiction includes limited comic books tie-ins and novelizations for such films as Terminator Salvation, Iron Man, The X-Files: I Want to Believe, Transformers, Transformers: Revenge of the Fallen, Transformers: Dark of the Moon, The Dark Knight Rises and Firefly.

Titan also publishes coffee table books on animation, popular culture, collectibles and comic and fantasy art including Harryhausen: The Lost Movies published in 2019 and Flash Gordon: The Official Story of the Film published in 2020 and Escape From New York: The Official Story of the Film published in 2021, all written by John Walsh.

Reprint comic collections 
 Beetle Bailey: Daily & Sunday Strips
 The Complete Flash Gordon Library
 Hägar the Horrible: The Epic Chronicles: The Dailies
 Mandrake the Magician
 The Simon & Kirby Library
 Tarzan - The Complete Burne Hogarth Sundays and Dailies Library

Titan Comics
Titan Books also publishes trade paperbacks and graphic novels in the UK and United States under the imprint Titan Comics. The company has a backlist of over 1,000 graphic novels. Its titles include such licensed characters and properties as Batman, Doctor Who, Family Guy, Heroes, Nemi, Superman, Judge Dredd and other 2000 AD characters, the Vertigo comic-book title Sandman, The Simpsons, Star Wars, Tank Girl, The Real Ghostbusters, Teenage Mutant Ninja Turtles, Transformers, The Walking Dead, Life Is Strange, Roy of the Rovers, Dan Dare, WWE Heroes, World of Warcraft and Bloodborne. In addition to licensed titles, Titan Comics also publishes creator-owned series, such as Bloodthirsty: One Nation Under Water (2015–2016) and Man Plus (2015–2016).

As of 2021, Titan Comics' publishing directors are Ricky Claydon and John Dziewiatkowski.

In 2016, Titan acquired the American hardboiled fiction imprint Hard Case Crime, and since that time has released a number of comics and graphic novels under the Hard Case Crime brand. Heroic Signatures gave Titan the license to publish new titles featuring Conan the Barbarian in 2022.

Titan Manga 
In 2022, the Titan Publishing Group launched Titan Manga, an imprint focused solely on manga series, with their first release being a "director's cut" of Takashi Okazaki's Afro Samurai.

Titan Magazines

References

External links

 Titan Books - official website
 Titan Comics - official website
 
 

 
Book publishing companies based in London
Comic book publishing companies of the United Kingdom
Titan
Manga distributors
British companies established in 1981
Publishing companies established in 1981
1981 establishments in England
Companies based in the London Borough of Southwark